Réo is a city located in the province of Sanguié in Burkina Faso. It is the capital of Sanguié Province, and is in its own department.

References 

Populated places in the Centre-Ouest Region
Sanguié Province